Greenside is a village in the extreme west of the Metropolitan County of Tyne and Wear, England. Once an independent village in County Durham, it became incorporated into Tyne and Wear in 1974 and then the Metropolitan Borough of Gateshead in 1986.

Location

Greenside is in the outer west of Gateshead, between the villages of Crawcrook and High Spen and not far from the small town of Ryton.

It also lies near the old lead route that ran from the north Pennines to Tyneside.

History

Largely rural in nature, Greenside was built upon coal mining and agriculture. With the creation of Greenside colliery, along with the nearby collieries of Emma, Clara and Stargate, the area grew in importance and its coal industry became extensive. By the early 20th century Greenside had the largest colliery in the district. The colliery closed in July 1966, the last shift being worked on Saturday 23 July.

In 2016 Banner Tales – an organisation dedicated to researching and maintaining the village's mining and industrial heritage – instituted the "Last Shift Festival" and this has now, under the title "Greenside Banner Festival", become an annual event. Each year the Greenside Miner's Lodge Banner is marched through the village accompanied by a Brass Band before joining the many other banners at Durham Miner's Gala. Banner Tales also organise an annual Greenside Community Picnic in the spirit of the miners' picnics of the past.

The wagonways used to transport coal, present in both Greenside and Crawcrook, provide a reminder of the area's importance in the coal trade. Although these routes are not used to transport coal any more, they are maintained as public footpaths, taking walkers through the surrounding countryside.

Greenside has many residents of Irish descent, who can trace their heritage back to the influx of Irish miners into the town in the 19th century.

Governance

In local government, Greenside is within the Crawcrook, Greenside and Clara Vale ward, which lies west of Gateshead and borders Northumberland.

Greenside is within the parliamentary constituency of Blaydon. Its current MP is Labour's Liz Twist.

Economy

After the decline of the coal industry, Greenside has not suffered the great deprivation that many other former mining areas have. One of the least deprived of Gateshead's wards, it is used increasingly as a commuter village for professionals travelling into the more urban areas of Tyneside.

Although it has not suffered the decline that many provincial villages have nationally in terms of local services, Greenside offers only a small selection of shops and business. For further groceries and white goods, residents can travel to the MetroCentre, Europe's largest shopping centre, around four miles towards Gateshead, as well as the shopping areas of Newcastle-Upon-Tyne.

There is an adequate, although declining, public transport service. Bus services operate to Crawcrook, Ryton, Blaydon, the MetroCentre and Newcastle. Residents wishing to travel west, past the county border into Northumberland and its towns such as Prudhoe, Stocksfield, Corbridge and Hexham can do so on one of a number of Go North East buses that depart from Crawcrook.

References

External links

 A community website, giving information on the village's history, local transport and activities
 A website that provides a history of coal mining in the former pit villages of County Durham, including Greenside

Villages in Tyne and Wear
Ryton, Tyne and Wear